Illegal Musik is a New Zealand Lifestyle Company with a primary focus on Music & Entertainment. Its success started via its development of R&B singer J.Williams and has grown to include a wide range of artists from various genres. It currently has a partnership with Warner Music NZ and Australia. Its record label HQ is based in New Zealand

Company history

Illegal Musik was founded by CEO Mark Arona (aka Patriarch of NZ hip hop group Ill Semantics) and business partner Eddie Bennett (aka Hard Work) mid-2007. Their first two signings J.Williams and Erakah picked up both Best Male and Female artist awards at the 2010 Pacific Island Music Awards.

The label's production house is headed up by Inoke Finau "N.O.X" (lead guitarist of Rock Band Junipah).

Illegal Musik produced the first all LIVE 3D Music Video for artist J.Williams 'You Got Me' through a partnership with New Zealand company 3D Live and Director Damien Caine. They picked up an award for the video 'You Got Me' for innovation in New Zealand Music in 2010, and the single also picked up 'Best Hip-Hop Video' at the Juice TV Awards (May 2010).

The label have also signed a partnership with Warner Australia and have released three singles from J.Williams 'You Got Me' (July/ August 2010). 'Takes Me Higher - Illegal Remix (2011) and 'Live It Up' (2011).

The name "Illegal Musik" came from the title of the first EP for founder Patriarch's group, Ill Semantics.

Notable artists
Illegal Musik has signed artists from different genres.

 DJCXL - member of Ill Semantics
 Erakah - R&B singer, best known for her collaboration with J.Williams on the single, "Your Style"
 Vince Harder - R&B singer, best known for his collaboration with P-Money
 J.Williams - R&B singer, who had a No.1 single, "You Got Me"
 K.One - rapper
 Tyson Tyler  - rapper
 Brooke Duff - pop singer, best known for her single "Till The End"
 Junipah - rock band
 Erin Simpson -  TV presenter

Previous artists
Titanium (Pop boy band, best known for their number one single, Come On Home.)

Discography
This is the list of albums released under Illegal Musik.

Albums

Singles

See also
 List of record labels: I–Q

References

New Zealand record labels
Warner Music labels
Hip hop record labels
Contemporary R&B record labels